Murat Petrovich Khrachev (born July 25, 1983 in Cherkessk, Karachayevo-Cherkesskaya) is a Russian boxer who competed in the men's lightweight division (– 60 kg) at the 2004 Summer Olympics and won the bronze medal.

Khrachev qualified for the 2004 Summer Olympics by ending up in first place at the 4th AIBA European 2004 Olympic Qualifying Tournament in Baku, Azerbaijan. In 2005 he was part of the Russian team that won the 2005 Boxing World Cup.

Olympic results 
Defeated Chen Tongzhou (China) 40-29
Defeated Anthony Little (Australia) RSC 3 (1:52)
Defeated Sam Rukundo (Uganda) 31-18
Lost to Mario Kindelán (Cuba) 18-31

References

External links 
Profile

1983 births
Living people
People from Cherkessk
Boxers at the 2004 Summer Olympics
Olympic boxers of Russia
Olympic bronze medalists for Russia
Olympic medalists in boxing
Russian male boxers
Medalists at the 2004 Summer Olympics
Lightweight boxers
Sportspeople from Karachay-Cherkessia